This is a list of results and statistics for matches of Romanian football club Pandurii Târgu Jiu on the European level.

Total statistics

Statistics by country

Statistics by competition

UEFA Europa League

External links
 UEFA website

Romanian football clubs in international competitions